Korey Wise (born Kharey Wise, July 26, 1972) is an American activist who travels the United States advocating for criminal justice reform. Wise shares his stories of being wrongfully convicted in the Central Park jogger case (along with Raymond Santana Jr., Kevin Richardson, Antron McCray, and Yusef Salaam) for the attack on Trisha Meili, a 28-year-old woman who was jogging in Central Park, as well as attacks on eight other people on the night of April 19, 1989. Wise spent approximately 14 years incarcerated, maintaining his innocence from 1989 until he was exonerated in 2002.

At 16 years old, Wise was the oldest of the so-called "Central Park Five", and was the only one of the five to serve all his time in the adult prison system. He was not a suspect in any of the crimes initially, and freely accompanied his friend to the police station. Once there, however, detectives decided to interrogate him about the rape of Meili, despite his name not originally being on the list of suspects.

In 2015, Wise donated $190,000 to the University of Colorado Law School Innocence Project, which was renamed the Korey Wise Innocence Project.

In 2019, the story was dramatized and released as a four-episode miniseries on Netflix entitled When They See Us. Actor Jharrel Jerome won the 2019 Primetime Emmy Award for Outstanding Lead Actor in a Limited Series or Movie for his portrayal of Wise.

In July 2019, Wise purchased a condominium overlooking Central Park. He is the only one of the five who chose to continue to reside in New York City after his release. During the COVID-19 pandemic, Wise helped provide sustenance to senior residents in Harlem.

References

External links 
 Korey Wise Innocence Project

1972 births
American prisoners and detainees
Living people
People wrongfully convicted of rape
American people convicted of rape
Activists from New York (state)
Activists for African-American civil rights
20th-century African-American people
Innocence Project